Colasposoma fairmairei is a species of leaf beetle. It is distributed in Nigeria, Ghana, Cameroon, Equatorial Guinea, the Republic of the Congo, the Democratic Republic of the Congo and Sudan. It was described by Édouard Lefèvre in 1877.

Subspecies
There are two subspecies of C. fairmairei:

 Colasposoma fairmairei fairmairei Lefèvre, 1877: The nominotypical subspecies. Distributed in Nigeria, Ghana, Cameroon, Equatorial Guinea, the Republic of the Congo, the Democratic Republic of the Congo.
 Colasposoma fairmairei katangense Burgeon, 1941: Distributed in the Democratic Republic of the Congo.

References

fairmairei
Beetles of the Democratic Republic of the Congo
Insects of West Africa
Insects of Cameroon
Insects of Equatorial Guinea
Insects of the Republic of the Congo
Insects of Sudan
Taxa named by Édouard Lefèvre